A partial solar eclipse occurred on December 13, 1974. A solar eclipse occurs when the Moon passes between Earth and the Sun, thereby totally or partly obscuring the image of the Sun for a viewer on Earth. A partial solar eclipse occurs in the polar regions of the Earth when the center of the Moon's shadow misses the Earth.

Related eclipses

Eclipses in 1974 
 A partial lunar eclipse on Tuesday, 4 June 1974.
 A total solar eclipse on Thursday, 20 June 1974.
 A total lunar eclipse on Friday, 29 November 1974.
 A partial solar eclipse on Friday, 13 December 1974.

Solar eclipses of 1971–1974

Metonic series

References

External links 

1974 in science
1974 12 13
December 1974 events